Aliabad-e Zahd Mahmud (also Romanized as ‘Alīābād-e Zāhd Maḩmūd; also known as ‘Alīābād-e Zād Maḩmūd) is a village in Howmeh Rural District, in the Central District of Larestan County, Fars Province, Iran. At the 2006 census, its population was 183, in 42 families.

References 

Populated places in Larestan County